Meet Danny Wilson is the debut album by Scottish pop group Danny Wilson. It became a significant hit in America on the strength of the summer of 1987 hit single "Mary's Prayer".

Track listing 
All tracks composed by Gary Clark.
   "Davy" (3:27)
   "Aberdeen" (2:23)
   "Mary's Prayer" (3:52)
   "Lorraine Parade" (3:40)
   "Nothing Ever Goes to Plan" (3:46)
   "Broken China" (4:25)
   "Steamtrains to the Milky Way" (4:27)
   "Spencer-Tracey" (1:27)
   "You Remain an Angel" (4:53)
   "Ruby's Golden Wedding" (3:10)
   "A Girl I Used to Know" (3:52)
   "Five Friendly Aliens" (4:38)
   "I Won't Be Here When You Get Home" (4:02)

Personnel

Danny Wilson
Gary Clark
Gerard Grimes
Kit Clark

Additional musicians
Note: These artists, as they appear in the album credits, are not listed with any specific instruments. However, if there is a specific instrument commonly associated with the musician, it is listed after the artist's name below.
Allan McGlone
David Palmer - drums
Geoff Dugmore - drums
Nils Tuxen - pedal steel guitar
Roddy Lorimer - trumpet
with:
Lester Bowie's Brass Fantasy

Notes
The recording of "A Girl I Used to Know" on the CD version is very different to the vinyl version. According to Gary Clark, the reason for the re-recording was that the band members weren't very happy with the original performance. This dissatisfaction, coupled with the record company looking for big singles from the album, meant the band felt compelled to try and capture the song again. The CD version was produced by Glen Skinner, while the vinyl version was produced by Dave Bascombe, who also produced the song "Mary's Prayer" from the same album.

"Broken China" appears in 2 reprise versions in "Spencer-Tracey" and in the end of "Five Friendly Aliens".

The song "Mary's Prayer" is featured in the 1998 film There's Something About Mary and is listed on the movie soundtrack.

"Nothing Ever Goes to Plan" is bossa nova.

The album also boasts an appearance by American jazz trumpeter Lester Bowie's Brass Fantasy.

In 2010, Australian actor/singer Jason Donovan recorded a cover version of "Mary's Prayer" for his '80s covers album Soundtrack of the 80s.  The album went top 20 in the UK in October 2010.

Notes 

1987 debut albums
Danny Wilson (band) albums
Virgin Records albums
Avant-pop albums